William Colquhoun (December 23, 1814 – September 2, 1898) was an Ontario businessman and political figure. He represented Stormont in the 1st Parliament of Ontario.

He was born in Charlottenburgh, Upper Canada in 1814. He settled at Dickinson's Landing where he was postmaster from 1841 to 1863 and operated a general store. He was the first treasurer for Osnabruck Township and later served as reeve for the township. In 1855, he was elected warden of the United Counties of Stormont, Dundas and Glengarry. He was re-elected in Stormont in 1871, but his election was overturned on appeal and he lost (but was victorious) the subsequent by-election in 1872.

He moved to Cornwall, Ontario in 1876, where he was mayor from 1881 to 1883 and also served as justice of the peace.

External links 
Canadian Scottish History site
A Cyclopæedia of Canadian biography : being chiefly men of the time..., GM Rose (1886)

1814 births
1898 deaths
Mayors of Cornwall, Ontario
Progressive Conservative Party of Ontario MPPs